In mathematics, the Lagrange numbers are a sequence of numbers that appear in bounds relating to the approximation of irrational numbers by rational numbers.  They are linked to Hurwitz's theorem.

Definition

Hurwitz improved Peter Gustav Lejeune Dirichlet's criterion on irrationality to the statement that a real number α is irrational if and only if there are infinitely many rational numbers p/q, written in lowest terms, such that

This was an improvement on Dirichlet's result which had 1/q2 on the right hand side.  The above result is best possible since the golden ratio φ is irrational but if we replace  by any larger number in the above expression then we will only be able to find finitely many rational numbers that satisfy the inequality for α = φ.

However, Hurwitz also showed that if we omit the number φ, and numbers derived from it, then we can increase the number . In fact he showed we may replace it with 2.  Again this new bound is best possible in the new setting, but this time the number  is the problem.  If we don't allow  then we can increase the number on the right hand side of the inequality from 2 to /5.  Repeating this process we get an infinite sequence of numbers , 2, /5, ... which converge to 3. These numbers are called the Lagrange numbers, and are named after Joseph Louis Lagrange.

Relation to Markov numbers

The nth Lagrange number Ln is given by

where mn is the nth Markov number, that is the nth smallest integer m such that the equation

has a solution in positive integers x and y.

References

External links
Lagrange number.  From MathWorld at Wolfram Research.
Introduction to Diophantine methods irrationality and transcendence  - Online lecture notes by Michel Waldschmidt, Lagrange Numbers on pp. 24–26.

Diophantine approximation